Armand Van Wambeke (16 May 1926 – 3 May 2011) was a Belgian basketball player. He competed in the men's tournament at the 1948 Summer Olympics.

References

1926 births
2011 deaths
Belgian men's basketball players
Olympic basketball players of Belgium
Basketball players at the 1948 Summer Olympics
Sportspeople from Ghent